The men's marathon event at the 1966 British Empire and Commonwealth Games was held on 10 August in Kingston, Jamaica.

Results

References

Athletics at the 1966 British Empire and Commonwealth Games
1966